Datumetine is a tropane alkaloid found in leaves of Datura metel. It is said to modulate NMDA receptor and thus causes memory loss. It also causes epileptic seizures in mice. Docking studies suggest that it fits on both allosteric and orthosteric sites of NMDA receptor. It acts together with other anticholinergic tropane alkaloids of datura to cause amnesia.

See also 
 Datura ferox

References 

Tropane alkaloids
Tropane alkaloids found in Solanaceae
Benzoic acids
Methoxy compounds
Phenyl compounds
NMDA receptor modulators